Fred Guillermety (2 June 1918 – 4 August 1965) was a Puerto Rican sports shooter. He competed at the 1960 Summer Olympics and the 1964 Summer Olympics.

References

1918 births
1965 deaths
Puerto Rican male sport shooters
Olympic shooters of Puerto Rico
Shooters at the 1960 Summer Olympics
Shooters at the 1964 Summer Olympics
Sportspeople from San Juan, Puerto Rico
People from Santurce, Puerto Rico
20th-century Puerto Rican people